Adoxophyes chloromydra is a species of moth of the family Tortricidae. It is found on Borneo.

References

Moths described in 1926
Adoxophyes
Moths of Asia